Edwin Albert Merritt (July 25, 1860 – December 4, 1914) was an American politician from New York.

Life
He was born on July 25, 1860, in Pierrepont, St. Lawrence County, New York, the son of Edwin Atkins Merritt (1828–1916), and was known all his life as Edwin A. Merritt, Jr. although father and son had different middle names.

Merritt Jr. graduated from Yale University in 1884. While at Yale, he was prominent among the undergraduate founders of the Wolf's Head Society, established in 1883 as The Third Society by the Phelps Trust Association. The society was founded with the aid of over 300 Yale alumni, including James Smith Bush, Charles Phelps Taft, Charles W. Harkness and William L. Harkness.

Merritt was a member of the New York State Assembly (St. Lawrence Co., 2nd D.) in 1902, 1903, 1904, 1905, 1906, 1907, 1908, 1909, 1910, 1911 and 1912; and was Majority Leader from 1908 to 1910, Minority Leader in 1911, and Speaker in 1912.

He was an alternate delegate to the 1908 Republican National Convention, and a delegate to the 1912 Republican National Convention.

He was elected to the 62nd United States Congress, to fill the vacancy caused by the death of George R. Malby, and was elected at the same time to the 63rd United States Congress, holding office from November 5, 1912, until his death on December 4, 1914, in Potsdam, New York. He was buried at Pierrepont Hill Cemetery in Pierrepont, N.Y.

See also
List of United States Congress members who died in office (1900–49)

Sources

 Edwin A. Merritt, late a representative from New York, Memorial addresses delivered in the House of Representatives and Senate frontispiece 1915

1860 births
1914 deaths
Yale University alumni
Speakers of the New York State Assembly
Republican Party members of the United States House of Representatives from New York (state)
19th-century American politicians